Anthony Boyle (born 8 June 1994) is an Irish actor. A graduate of Royal Welsh College of Music and Drama in Cardiff, Boyle began his acting career on London stage and rose to prominence for originating the role of Scorpius Malfoy in the West End and Broadway productions of the British play Harry Potter and the Cursed Child (2016), for which he won the Laurence Olivier Award for Best Actor in a Supporting Role and was nominated for the Tony Award for Best Featured Actor in a Play. He is also known for starring as Geoffrey Bache Smith in the film Tolkien and Alvin Levin in the mini-series The Plot Against America.

Early life and education
Boyle was born in West Belfast, and attended De La Salle College until the age of 17. He then went to St Louise's Comprehensive College, and in 2013, began training at the Royal Welsh College of Music and Drama in Cardiff before graduating in 2016 with a BA (Hons) in acting. Boyle was raised Catholic.

Acting credits

Film

Television

Theatre

Radio

Accolades

Theatre

References

External links
 

1994 births
Living people
21st-century male actors from Northern Ireland
Alumni of the Royal Welsh College of Music & Drama
Laurence Olivier Award winners
Male actors from Belfast
Male film actors from Northern Ireland
Male stage actors from Northern Ireland
Male television actors from Northern Ireland
Theatre World Award winners